Yann Boé-Kane (born 5 April 1991) is a French professional footballer who plays as a midfielder for Quevilly-Rouen.

Career
After making his debut in the French semi-professional leagues with Vannes, Boé-Kane made his full professional debut when he joined Auxerre in 2013, with a 0–0 Ligue 2 draw against Nancy.

After spending six months in Greece with Ergotelis, Boé-Kane joined Ligue 2 newcomers Red Star in June 2015.

After having a successful campaign with Red Star, in which the team finished fifth in the 2015–16 Ligue 2 season, Boé-Kane joined AC Ajaccio on a two-year deal, in July 2016.

On 20 June 2019, after three years at Ajaccio, Boé-Kane joined newly promoted Ligue 2 club Le Mans FC. He left at the end of the 2019–20 after Le Mans were relegated.

On 16 July 2021, he signed with Quevilly-Rouen.

Personal life
Born in France, Boé-Kane is of Senegalese descent.

References

External links

Yann Boé-Kane foot-national.com Profile

1991 births
Living people
People from Angoulême
French footballers
French sportspeople of Senegalese descent
Association football midfielders
Ligue 2 players
Championnat National players
Vannes OC players
AJ Auxerre players
Ergotelis F.C. players
Red Star F.C. players
AC Ajaccio players
Le Mans FC players
Liga I players
FC Astra Giurgiu players
US Quevilly-Rouen Métropole players
French expatriate footballers
Expatriate footballers in Greece
French expatriate sportspeople in Greece
Expatriate footballers in Romania
French expatriate sportspeople in Romania
Sportspeople from Charente
Footballers from Nouvelle-Aquitaine